Bharwara Sewage Treatment Plant (STP) is located at Bharwara in Gomtinagar locality of Lucknow.Operation commenced in 2011, on the then chief minister Mayawati's birthday. The project cost .

References

Sewage treatment plants
Water supply and sanitation in India
Buildings and structures in Lucknow